Émilie Castonguay is Assistant General Manager for the Vancouver Canucks of the National Hockey League and a former Canadian sports agent, currently the only woman certified as a player agent by the NHLPA.

Career
Growing up in Montreal, she played youth hockey with boys before earning a scholarship to study at Niagara University. Across 121 NCAA games from 2005 to 2009, she scored 23 points, usually playing as a third-line checker and being named team captain in her final two seasons. She obtained a bachelor's degree in finance from the university, and was awarded a National Scholar Athlete award during her time there.

After graduating, she interned with Montreal Canadiens general manager Pierre Gauthier. After completing the internship, she returned to university to obtain a law degree from l'Université de Montréal.

In 2016, she became the first female NHLPA-certified player agent. Among her notable clients are Canadian national team captain Marie-Philip Poulin and NHL first overall draft pick Alexis Lafrenière. She was named one of the 25 most powerful women in hockey by Sportsnet in 2020.

On January 24, 2022, she was hired by the Vancouver Canucks as assistant general manager, becoming the second woman to have that job in the NHL (the first since 1996-1997). During the first season she was named in a lawsuit that accused her of harassment and mental anguish of a former employee that she managed directly.

References

External links

Living people
Year of birth missing (living people)
Université de Montréal alumni
Canadian sports agents
Niagara University alumni
Ice hockey people from Quebec
Niagara Purple Eagles women's ice hockey